Jan Eric Ingvar Kärnefelt (born 1944) is a Swedish lichenologist.

Early life and education
Kärnefelt was born in Gothenburg, Sweden in 1944. His initial goal in his higher-level studies at University of Cologne in 1966–1967 was to become a dentist. He changed courses in 1968, turning instead to biology at the University of Gothenburg in 1968. Gunnar Degelius, his first teacher during undergraduate studies in botany in 1968, inspired him and others. After Degelius' retirement in 1969, Ingvar continued his studies at Lund University, where Hans Runemark held a position in systematic botany. In 1971 he met Ove Almborn, who became his supervisor. In 1979, he defended his thesis titled "The brown fruticose species of Cetraria". The thesis was later awarded a prize for the best doctoral dissertation in botany at Lund University during a 5-year period by the Royal Physiographic Society in Lund.

Career
Kärnefelt became associate professor at the Department of Systematic Botany at the University of Lund, where he mentored several PhD students.

Kärnefelt's research interests include the Parmeliaceae and the Teloschistaceae, both families in which he described several taxa new to science. In 1987 he started a project regarding the status of threatened lichens in southern Sweden. This project, which was extended until 1995, provided funding for his PhD students and resulted in the publication of a highly cited book in 1997. Kärnefelt became director of the Botaniska trädgården in 1994, and Professor in 2000.

Kärnefelt was the president of the International Association for Lichenology from 1992–1996, and later elected Honorary President of this association for life. In the period 1997–2005 he was the editor-in-chief for the journal of the Nordic Lichen Society, Graphis Scripta, and has been on the editorial board of the Nordic Journal of Botany since 2001.

Recognition
He had an entire issue of The Lichenologist (volume 41, issue 5, 2009) dedicated to him, with articles written by former students.

Eponymy
Four genera and several species have been named to honour Kärnefelt. These include: Ikaeria ; Ingvariella ; Kaernefeltia ; Kaernefia ; Caloplaca kaernefeltii , Catapyrenium kaernefeltii ; Hypotrachyna kaernefeltii ; Placomaronea kaernefeltii ; and Xanthoria kaernefeltii .

See also
 :Category:Taxa named by Ingvar Kärnefelt

References

1944 births
Living people
Lund University alumni
Academic staff of Lund University
Swedish lichenologists
Swedish taxonomists
20th-century Swedish scientists
21st-century Swedish scientists